CVH may refer to:

Ford CVH engine, an engine used in Ford vehicles from 1980 to 2004
CVH, IATA airport code of Caviahue Airport (Argentina)
Credit Valley Hospital, a regional hospital located in Mississauga, Ontario
Connecticut Valley Hospital,  a psychiatric hospital in Middletown, Connecticut
Common variable immunodeficiency, also known by the older name of common variable hypogammaglobulinemia (CVH)
"Classic Van Halen", the iteration of the American rock band fronted by original lead vocalist David Lee Roth